Professor Maree Rose Teesson AC, FAAHMS, FASSA, is an Australian expert on mental health. She is the Director of The Matilda Centre for Research in Mental Health and Substance Use and NHMRC Principal Research Fellow at the University of Sydney. She is also professorial fellow at the Black Dog Institute, UNSW.

She is an elected Fellow of the Australian Academy of Health and Medical Sciences (FAAHMS), and an elected Fellow of the Academy of the Social Sciences in Australia (FASSA).

Education and career 
Teesson holds a BSc (Psychology)(Hons) and PhD (Psychiatry) from the University of New South Wales. Her 1995 PhD Thesis was "An evaluation of mental health service delivery in an inner city area".

She is the author of more than 280 publications, and her work has been cited more than 9,000 times.

In 2018 Teesson launched an innovative eHealth program at the University of New South Wales to target the six main lifestyle risk factors among teenagers, including binge eating and unhealthy eating, to help prevent chronic disease.

Awards and recognition 
In recognition of her achievements in education, research and mentoring, Teesson received the 2013 UNSW Faculty of Medicine Dean's Award for Outstanding Achievement.
Teesson went on to win the 2014 University of Technology, Sydney Eureka Prize for Outstanding Mentor of Young Researchers for her achievements in fostering and developing her teams, as well as reaching out to more than 20,000 Australian high-school students with online programs that focus on preventing alcohol and drug related harm.

In 2014 she was named by the Australian Financial Review as one of the "100 Women of Influence" in the Innovation category. In 2015 she was presented with the Society for Mental Health Research Oration Award for her rise to prominence within the Australian and New Zealand psychiatric research community.

On Australia Day 2018 she was appointed a Companion of the Order of Australia for eminent service to medicine, particularly to the prevention and treatment of substance use disorders, as a researcher and author, to innovative mental health policy development, to education, and as a role model for young researchers.

Selected publications

 Addictions, co-authored with Louisa Degenhardt and Wayne Hall, Hove, 2002, ; 2nd ed. Hove, East Sussex New York Psychology Press, 2012, 
 Comorbid Mental Disorders and Substance Use Disorders : Epidemiology, Prevention and Treatment, co-edited with Heather Proudfoot, Dept. of Health and Ageing, 2003,

References

Year of birth missing (living people)
Living people
Fellows of the Australian Academy of Health and Medical Sciences
Companions of the Order of Australia
Fellows of the Academy of the Social Sciences in Australia
Academic staff of the University of New South Wales
Australian psychologists
Australian women psychologists
Australian women scientists